This is a list of renamed places in the Republic of the Congo.

Cities 
 Ncouna → Brazzaville (1884)
 Dolisie → Loubomo (1975) → Dolisie (1991)
 Jacob → Nkayi (1975)
 Rousset (1903) → Fort-Rousset (1904) → Owando (1977)
 Ponta Negra → Pointe-Noire

See also 
 Lists of renamed places
 List of city name changes

References 

Geography of the Republic of the Congo
History of the Republic of the Congo
Congo, Republic of
Congo, Republic of, renamed
Renamed places
Congo, Republic of
Congo, Republic of